Alcamenes or Alcmenes may refer to:
Alcamenes, Athenian sculptor of the 5th century BC
Alcmenes, Agiad king of Sparta from the 8th century BC
Alcamenes, son of Sthenelaides, Spartan general in the 5th century BC